Hendrik Nienhuis (12 February 1790 in Ten Boer – 28 November 1862 in Groningen) was a Dutch legal scholar, rector of the University of Groningen in 1829–30 and 1844–45, and a conservative member of the House of Representatives of the Netherlands in 1848, who voted against Thorbecke's revision of the Constitution of the Netherlands.

References
Prof.Mr. H. Nienhuis at Parlement & Politiek

1790 births
1862 deaths
Dutch legal scholars
Dutch corporate directors
Members of the House of Representatives (Netherlands)
People from Ten Boer
University of Groningen alumni
Academic staff of the University of Groningen